The 1984 European Parliament election was the first since the inaugural election of 1979 and the 1981 enlargement of the European Community to include Greece. It was also the last before the accession of Spain and Portugal in 1986.

Results showed centre-left and right-wing MEPs profiting at the expense of the far-left and centre-right. The Socialists consolidated their position as the biggest group in the Parliament, and there were notable changes for the smaller groups, with far-right MEPs forming a group and the coalescence of the Green and Regionalist group known as "Rainbow". Overall turnout dropped to 61%. No majority was achieved.

Electoral system
There was no single voting system for all member states; each of them adopted its own method, established by national law.

The United Kingdom used a one-round (first-past-the-post) system of 78 constituencies in England, Wales and Scotland, while in Northern Ireland 3 proportional seats were allocated. Belgium, Ireland and Italy used a proportional system with subdivision of the territory into constituencies. Denmark, France, West Germany, Greece, Luxembourg and the Netherlands used a single national proportional system, although in the case of Denmark Greenland had its own constituency with the allocation of one seat and in the case of West Germany the three seats for the West Berlin area were not directly elected but were chosen by the Berlin House of Representatives, given the particular status of the city.

Pre-election

Seat changes

The number of seats was the same as before for each member state that took part in the 1979 election. Greece, which had joined in 1981, was allocated 24 new seats. This raised the number of seats to 434 from 410.

Campaign

Election and regrouping

Overview

The Socialists increased their share by six seats to 130 seats, up from 124 before the elections. The Democratic Alliance (formerly Progressive Democrats) also made gains, up by seven to 29 seats. The People's Party's, the European Democrats, Communists and Liberals all lost seats. The French National Front and the Italian Social Movement founded a group called the "European Right": the first far-right group in the Parliament. The Technical Group of Independents was replaced by the Rainbow Group, a mixture of Greens and Regionalists.

Final results

Results by country

Statistics

Post-election

External links
 The election of the Members of the European Parliament European Navigator
 Full Election Details Elections Online (In French)

 
1984 elections in Europe
June 1984 events in Europe